Tiana Lemnitz (26 October 1897 – 5 February 1994) was a German operatic soprano. Her major operatic career took place between the two world wars (1919-1939).

Life and career
The youngest of 10 children, she was born in Metz to a musical family. She began to sing at the age of seven and at 15 she entered the Metz Music School. Later, she studied voice with Antoni Kohmann at the Hoch Conservatory in Frankfurt. Starting with small opera companies, she made her debut in Heilbronn in Albert Lortzing's opera Undine in 1921. She then sang in Aachen (1922–28), Hannover (1928–34) while making several guest appearances in Dresden (1931–34).

She also sang regularly at the Munich State Opera, the Vienna State Opera and the Salzburg Festival.

Lemnitz was a prominent Nazi and was known to boast of having been appointed to the Berlin State Opera by Hermann Göring, commander-in-chief of the Luftwaffe.

She sang Marguerite in Faust in Warsaw in 1937 next to the Mephisto of Feodor Chaliapin.

She also took an interest in Slavic operas and became a noted interpreter of operas such as Dalibor, Jenůfa, Wozzeck.

Lemnitz was also admired as a recitalist notably in Lieder. She began recording in 1934 for Polydor with arias from Der Freischütz and Lohengrin. She recorded for  Electrola in Germany (1937–48) and for HMV (1938-9).

Tiana Lemnitz died in Berlin in 1994 at the age of 96.

Assessment
According to Musical America, What more adjectives can do justice to the Elisabeth of Tiana Lemnitz! This beautiful voice, this superlative vocalism, this absolute supremacy of the technical and the interpretative in which the economy of gesture lent the whole a spiritual grandeur. It was wonderful ... Lemnitz remained unique in the perfection of her performance.
 
An English reviewer wrote: "The greatest moment of the evening came in the quintet [of Meistersinger]. Lemnitz, beginning the movement, sang so beautifully that—without being rude—one was conscious of nothing else."  Wagner's biographer Ernest Newman thought her Eva the best he had ever seen.
 
Lemnitz said of herself: "I am very earnest in my art and consider it as a holy legacy which shall procure some of the higher sense of life to the people."

Sources
 Operissimo.com 

1897 births
1994 deaths
German operatic sopranos
Hoch Conservatory alumni
Lorraine-German people
20th-century German  women opera singers
Women in Nazi Germany